The Fredericks Foundation is a British microfinance charity that provides financial support and advice for social enterprises and charities.

Charitable work
The Fredericks Foundation was established in 2001 by entrepreneur Paul Barry-Walsh, with the aim of assisting disadvantaged people to become self-employed, start their own business or find paid employment, and helping struggling businesses in difficult economic conditions. Fredericks is a Registered Charity (no 1086562)

The Fredericks Foundation has made over 1900 loans in its first 20 years of operation, with an average of £6,000 per loan. Fredericks has primarily concentrated on start-up microfinance for the financially disadvantaged. Prime Minister David Cameron attended the 10th Anniversary Conference at Blenheim Palace to launch the Fredericks Oxfordshire operation.

References

External links
 Official website

Social welfare charities based in the United Kingdom
Microfinance organizations